Atelopus exiguus is a species of toad in the family Bufonidae. It is endemic to Ecuador and only known from the area of its type locality in the Azuay Province of southern Ecuador, in the sub-páramo and páramo of Cordillera Occidental. Common name Mazán jambato frog has been proposed for it.

Description
Adult males measure  and females  in snout–vent length. The body robust with short and thick legs. The snout is acuminate. The dorsum and flanks are bright yellowish-green to blackish-green, and the venter is yellow to orange. The iris is almost entirely black. The dorsal surfaces have some warts. Tympanum is absent.

Habitat and conservation
This formerly abundant species is believed to have declined. Both habitat loss (from agriculture, dams, or climate change), chytridiomycosis, and invasive trout are threats. The species occurs in the Cajas National Park and Mazán Protected Forest.

References

exiguus
Amphibians of the Andes
Amphibians of Ecuador
Endemic fauna of Ecuador
Amphibians described in 1892
Taxa named by Oskar Boettger
Taxonomy articles created by Polbot